Kham Kaeo is a sub-district (tambon) in So Phisai District, in Bueng Kan Province, northeastern Thailand. As of 2010, it had a population of 9,576 people, with jurisdiction over 13 villages.

References

Tambon of Bueng Kan province
Populated places in Bueng Kan province
So Phisai District